Jasper van Dijk (born 20 April 1971 in Jutphaas) is a Dutch politician and former civil servant. As a member of the Socialist Party (Socialistische Partij) he has been an MP since 30 November 2006. He focuses on matters of education and the Dutch defense.

From March to November 2006 he was a member of the municipal council of Amsterdam.

Van Dijk studied political science at the University of Amsterdam. In 1990 he lived for a year in the Israeli kibbutz of HaSolelim near Nazareth.

References 
  Parlement.com biography

External links 
  House of Representatives biography

1971 births
Living people
20th-century Dutch civil servants
21st-century Dutch politicians
Dutch expatriates in Israel
Dutch political scientists
Members of the House of Representatives (Netherlands)
Municipal councillors of Amsterdam
People from Nieuwegein
Socialist Party (Netherlands) politicians
University of Amsterdam alumni